WCVC is a radio station broadcasting on 1330 kilohertz in Tallahassee, Florida. WCVC is owned and operated by Guadalupe Radio Network of Midland Texas, and broadcasts a Catholic talk format from EWTN. It was a Christian-formatted station, then changed its format in April 2001 to a talk radio station, with callers and hosts discussing news and events of national and local interest. The station changed its format again, to EWTN, in August 2005.

External links
FCC History Cards for WCVC 

CVC
Catholic radio stations
CVC
Radio stations established in 1953
1953 establishments in Florida
CVC